Desmond White may refer to:

 Des White (born 1927), New Zealand rugby league footballer
 Desmond White (footballer) (1911–1985), Scottish amateur football goalkeeper